Yaakov Agmon (June 24, 1929 – December 16, 2020) was an Israeli theater producer, manager, and director.

Biography
Yaakov Agmon grew up in Tel Aviv, and was a member of the Hashomer Hatzair youth movement. He later moved to Kibbutz Harel, where he was involved with the planning and organization of events for the kibbutz movement. He was married to the actress Gila Almagor. Agmon died from pneumonia in the Sheba Medical Center in Ramat Gan on December 16, 2020 at the age of 91.

Theater and media career
Between 1956-1958, Agmon served as the director of the youth section in the United Jewish Appeal and also as a columnist and the secretary of the Rimon weekly publication. In 1958, after a reorganization of the Cameri Theatre, Agmon was appointed general director, a post he held for the next four years. In 1962 Agmon went to study in the United States and served as an advisor for the America Israel Cultural Foundation.

In 1964, Agmon established the Bimot Theatre. In 1978, he founded Beit Lessin Theater. From 1968, Agmon hosted a weekly radio talk show, She'elot Ishiyot, on Israel Army Radio.

In 1995, Agmon was appointed general and artistic director of the Habima Theatre, in order to pull the theatre out of a financial crisis. He retired from the position in 2005, failing to achieve this goal, after much criticism. In 2010, Agmon was appointed general manager of the Arabic-Hebrew theater of Jaffa.

Awards and recognition
In 2007, Agmon was awarded the Israeli theater award for his life's work.

References

External links
 The America-Israel Cultural Foundation
 Habima National Theatre
 Beit Lessin Theatre
 Cameri Theatre

1929 births
2020 deaths
Polish emigrants to Mandatory Palestine
Israeli people of Polish-Jewish descent
Polish Jews in Israel
Israeli theatre directors
Israeli theatre managers and producers
People from Tel Aviv
20th-century Israeli Jews
21st-century Israeli Jews
Deaths from pneumonia in Israel